Ysgol Gyfun Cwm Rhymni is a Welsh-medium school situated in the village of Fleur-de-Lys in the Rhymney Valley. Cwm Rhymni was founded in 1981 with just over 150 pupils and has since grown to 1,684 pupils with 1,164 at the Gellihaf campus and 520 at Y Gwyndy (September 2018).

The school's motto is “Tua'r Goleuni”(Towards the Light) and its badge is a dragon rampant. The school is traditionally represented by the colours red and black.

A new campus for Ysgol Gyfun Cwm Rhymni opened in Caerphilly Area in 2013 for years 7 through 11; Ysgol Gyfun Cwm Rhymni – Safle'r Gwyndy, due to the demand of a new Welsh Medium school. The previous school is now called Ysgol Gyfun Cwm Rhymni – Safle Gellihaf so it is not confused with the other campus. The original Cwm Rhymni school was based in Aberbargoed (years 7-8) and Bargoed (years 9-13).

History 

Cwm Rhymni was originally situated on two sites, a Lower school for years 7 and 8 and an Upper school for years 9 to 13, situated in Aberbargoed and Bargoed respectively. By the late 1990s these buildings were in very poor condition, and after a long struggle the school was finally granted permission to build a new state of the art one-site building in Fleur-de-lys, which opened in 2002. The new building was funded through PFI. The original Headmaster of Cwm Rhymni was Mr Huw Thomas, who was succeeded by Mr Hefin Mathias in 1995. Mr Mathias was in turn succeeded upon his retirement in 2008 by Mr Owain ap Dafydd. In April 2020, following the retirement of Mr ap Dafydd, Mr Matthew Webb was appointed the Headteacher.

1989 fire
On Wednesday 8 November 1989, Gareth Curtis, aged 16, and Paul James, aged 15, were sentenced at Cardiff to three years; the fire cost £2.2m. The former St Ilan school was destroyed by arson in 1989.

Headteachers

 1981–1995 (Mr Huw Thomas)
 1995–2008 (Mr Hefin Mathias)
 2008–2020 (Mr Owain ap Dafydd)
 2020–present (Mr Matthew Webb)

Ysgol Gyfun Cwm Rhymni has a strong reputation in relation to sports, especially in rugby and athletics. The school has also fared very well down the years in the Urdd Eisteddfod.

Cwm Rhymni has a very large catchment area stretching from Rhymney near the top of the valley to Caerphilly. The breadth of the catchment area is reflected by the names of the three main corridors at the Gellihaf campus; Ebwy, Sirhywi and Rhymni; three adjoining South Wales Valleys that all feed some pupils into Cwm Rhymni. Prior to the establishment of Ysgol Gyfun Gwynllyw in 1988, Cwm Rhymni's catchment area also included the whole of the county of Gwent and pupils attended the school from as far afield as Newport and Chepstow.

The school's four houses are named after Welsh saints: Mabon (house colour: yellow), Cadog (green), Tudful (purple) and Sannan (blue). Tudful was a later addition to the original three houses as the school's numbers grew in the early 1990s.  In 2009, a new house, Ilan, was also created in addition to the previous four houses because of the growing number of students.

Primary Feeder Schools 
Ysgol Gyfun Cwm Rhymni is the only Welsh medium Comprehensive school in the Caerphilly borough and is fed by 11 primary schools
Ysgol Gymraeg Bro Allta
Ysgol Gymraeg Bro Sannan
Ysgol Gymraeg Cwm Derwen
Ysgol Gymraeg Cwm Gwyddon
Ysgol Gymraeg Caerffili
Ysgol Gymraeg Gilfach Fargod
Ysgol Gymraeg Ifor Bach
Ysgol Gymraeg Penalltau
Ysgol Gymraeg Trelyn
Ysgol Gymraeg Y Castell
Ysgol Gymraeg Y Lawnt

Partneriaeth 6 
Cwm Rhymni currently has a partnership with Ysgol Gymraeg Gwynllyw, Pontypool. With this partnership more courses are made available in both schools. This type of programme has been tried in many schools before but the main difference with partneriaeth 6 is that the teachers travel between the schools or teach via conference link. Currently the school is trying to expand this partnership to include Ysgol Gyfun Rhydywaun

Notable former pupils

Morgan Evans, Gloucestershire All Golds rugby league player
Natasha Harding, Bristol Academy and Wales footballer
Sali Hughes, journalist, writer and broadcaster
Delyth Jewell, Plaid Cymru politician
Steffan Jones (rugby player), Newport Gwent Dragons rugby player
Rhodri Lloyd, Welsh Rugby League International player, Wigan and Swinton
David Probert, jockey
Aaron Ramsey, Juventus and Wales footballer

References

Arson in the 1980s
Educational institutions established in 1981
Secondary schools in Caerphilly County Borough
School buildings in the United Kingdom destroyed by arson
Welsh-language schools
1981 establishments in Wales